Norrback is a surname. Notable people with the surname include:

Anders Norrback (born 1963), Finnish politician
Arne Norrback (born 1937), Swedish weightlifter
Karl-Fredrik Norrback (born 1972), Swedish physician
Ole Norrback (born 1941), Finnish politician and diplomat